Xizhou Township (Wade-Giles: Hsi1-chou1 Hsiang1) is a rural township in Changhua County, Taiwan. It is the third largest township in Changhua County after Erlin and Fangyuan.

Administrative divisions

The township comprises 19 villages: Caigong, Chaoyang, Chenggong, Dazhuang, Ganyuan, Jiumei, Kengcuo, Rongguang, Santiao, Sanzun, Shuiwei, Tungzhou, Wacuo, Weicuo, Xicuo, Xipan, Xizhou, Zhangcuo and Zunliao.

Tourist attractions
 Changhua Fitzroy Gardens
 Xiluo Bridge

Notable natives
 Bobby Chen, singer and producer
 Hsieh Yi-fong, member of Legislative Yuan

References

External links
  Xizhou Government website

Townships in Changhua County